The episodes from the fourth season of the Japanese anime television series Gintama are directed by Yoichi Fujita and animated by Sunrise. It premiered on TV Tokyo on April 2, 2009, and ended on March 25, 2010. The anime is based on Hideaki Sorachi's manga of the same name. The story revolves around an eccentric samurai, Gintoki Sakata, his apprentice, Shinpachi Shimura, and a teenage alien girl named Kagura. All three are "freelancers" who search for work in order to pay the monthly rent, which usually goes unpaid anyway.

On January 8, 2009, the streaming video site Crunchyroll began offering English subtitled episodes of the series. The first available episode was episode 139. On the same day, Crunchyroll also began uploading episodes from the beginning of the series at a rate of two a week. Sunrise released the season in thirteen DVD volumes from on October 28, 2009, to October 27, 2010. 

This season has been using six musical pieces: two opening themes and four endings themes. The first opening is "Stairway Generation" by Base Ball Bear and is replaced by "Light Infection" by Prague in episode 177. Episode 184 exchanges the use of the themes; with "Wonderful Days" as the opening and "Light Infection" as the ending theme.



Episode list

References
General

Specific

2009 Japanese television seasons
2010 Japanese television seasons
Season 4